Scabrotrophon maranii is a species of sea snail, a marine gastropod mollusk, in the family Muricidae, the murex snails or rock snails.

Description
The length of the shell attains 32.8 mm.

Distribution
This marine species occurs off Papua New Guinea.

References

 Houart, R. & Héros, V. (2016). New species and records of deep water muricids (Gastropoda: Muricidae) from Papua New Guinea. Vita Malacologica. 15: 7-34.

maranii
Gastropods described in 2016